Sopore railway station is situated in the outskirts of Sopore town. It lies on Northern Railway Network Zone of Indian Railways. It is one of the northernmost station of Indian Railways.

Location
The station is located at Amargrah about 2 km from Sopore town towards south on Srinagar-Sopore highway.

History

The station has been built as part of the Jammu–Baramulla line megaproject, intending to link the Kashmir Valley with Jammu Tawi and the rest of the Indian railway network.

Design
The station features Kashmiri wood architecture, with an intended ambience of a royal court which is designed to complement the local surroundings to the station.  Station signage is predominantly in Urdu, English and Hindi.

Reduced level
The station is situated on R.L. of 1589 m above mean sea level.

See also
Baramulla railway station
Srinagar railway station

References

Railway stations in Baramulla district
Railway stations opened in 2008
Sopore